Mace Windu is a fictional character in the Star Wars franchise, portrayed by Samuel L. Jackson in the prequel trilogy. Jackson later reprised the role with voice only in the 2008 animated film Star Wars: The Clone Wars and the 2019 sequel film The Rise of Skywalker, whilst Terrence C. Carson voiced the character in other projects, such as The Clone Wars animated television series. The character also appears in various canon and non-canon Star Wars media like books, comics, and video games.

In the fictional Star Wars universe, Mace Windu is portrayed as a Jedi Master who sits on the High Council during the final years of the Galactic Republic. He is notable for wielding a unique purple-bladed lightsaber, and is regarded as one of the most powerful Jedi of his time, second only to Yoda. He is a leading defender of the Republic during the Clone Wars, even as the conflict leads him to question his most firmly held beliefs. Windu develops an antagonistic relationship with Anakin Skywalker, due to his initial opposition to him being trained as a Jedi and later for denying him the rank of Jedi Master, stemming from Anakin's unstable nature and tendency to allow emotions to cloud his judgement. This contributes to Anakin ultimately betraying the Jedi and turning to the dark side of the Force after helping the Sith Lord Darth Sidious kill Windu.

Character conception and overview
Several early incarnations of the character who would become Mace Windu were developed in George Lucas's original Star Wars drafts as the narrator, Princess Leia's brother and Luke Skywalker's friend. Through the process of redrafting and copyediting, his character was removed from the original trilogy, but was reintroduced in 1994 when Lucas began writing the prequel trilogy.

Although his weapon was not seen onscreen until Episode II – Attack of the Clones, action figures released for Episode I – The Phantom Menace paired Mace with a blue lightsaber. During the production of Attack of the Clones, Samuel L. Jackson asked Lucas if his character could wield a purple lightsaber as a way of making the character easily distinguishable in large battle scenes. According to Jackson, the hilt was engraved with "bad motherfucker", a reference to his role in Pulp Fiction; the engraving is not visible in the films.

Appearances

Film

Skywalker saga

The Phantom Menace (1999)
Introduced in Star Wars: Episode I – The Phantom Menace, Mace Windu is depicted as one of the leading members of the Jedi Order, second only to Yoda. The maverick Jedi Master Qui-Gon Jinn comes before the Jedi High Council, which Windu is a member of, and offers to train Anakin Skywalker, believing that the boy is the Chosen One of Jedi prophecy. Windu and the other Council members decline, deeming Anakin too old and full of fear. After the corrupt Trade Federation is defeated and Obi-Wan Kenobi defeats the Sith Lord Darth Maul, who killed Qui-Gon, Windu realizes that the Sith have returned, and he and the Council reluctantly allow Obi-Wan to train Anakin in Qui-Gon's stead.

Attack of the Clones (2002)
In Star Wars: Episode II – Attack of the Clones, set 10 years after the previous film, Windu initially refuses to believe that the assassination attempt on Senator Padmé Amidala on Coruscant was authorized by former Jedi Master Count Dooku, now the leader of a galactic Separatist movement. After Obi-Wan is captured on Geonosis while investigating the Separatists, Windu leads a cadre of Jedi to rescue him, Padmé and Anakin from being executed at Dooku's order. In the ensuing battle, Windu kills bounty hunter Jango Fett, the template for the Republic's army of clone troopers, before he and the other Jedi lead the Clone Army to victory in a battle with Dooku's forces. At the end of the film, with the Clone Wars begun, Windu resolves to keep a closer eye on the increasingly corrupt Galactic Senate.

Revenge of the Sith (2005)
In Star Wars: Episode III – Revenge of the Sith, set three years after the beginning of the Clone Wars, Windu and the other members of the Jedi Council are concerned that the Republic's Supreme Chancellor, Palpatine, may not relinquish his emergency powers when the Clone Wars end. Their suspicions only grow when the Senate grants Palpatine a vote on the Jedi Council by appointing Anakin as his personal representative. The Council makes Anakin a member, but Windu notifies Anakin that they do not grant him the rank of Jedi Master, infuriating the Jedi Knight and diminishing his trust in the council. Further, the Council orders Anakin to spy on Palpatine.

After Obi-Wan kills Separatist leader General Grievous, Palpatine reveals to Anakin that he is the Sith Lord the Council had been searching for. Anakin informs Windu that Palpatine is Darth Sidious, the mastermind of the war. Telling Anakin to stay behind, Windu and three other Jedi Masters (Kit Fisto, Agen Kolar and Saesee Tiin) attempt to arrest Palpatine, but the Sith Lord easily cuts down Windu's companions and then duels him one-on-one. Windu gets the upper hand and subdues Palpatine just as Anakin arrives. Anakin, needing Palpatine to teach him the power to prevent his wife Padmé's foreseen death, pleads with Windu to spare Palpatine, remarking that killing an unarmed opponent goes against the Jedi way. Windu counters that Palpatine is too dangerous to be kept alive and prepares to summarily execute him. However, Anakin intervenes on Palpatine's behalf, disarming Windu by severing his right hand. Palpatine then kills Windu with a blast of Force lightning, sending him falling to his death out of his office's window. Palpatine later uses Windu's death to brand the Jedi as traitors of the Republic and to initiate Order 66, which results in the vast majority of the Jedi being killed by clone troopers.

The Rise of Skywalker (2019)
Samuel L. Jackson makes a vocal cameo as Mace Windu in Star Wars: The Rise of Skywalker, the final installment of the Star Wars sequel trilogy. During the battle between Rey and a resurrected Palpatine, Windu's voice is heard by the former, encouraging her to fight back and finally destroy the Sith.

Other films

The Clone Wars (2008) 
Windu plays a supporting role in the 2008 animated film Star Wars: The Clone Wars, set shortly after the beginning of the Clone Wars. He is depicted as a General in the Grand Army of the Republic, like all other Jedi Masters. Samuel L. Jackson reprised his role from the prequel film trilogy.

Television

The Clone Wars (2008–2014; 2020) 
Mace Windu has a supporting role in the animated series Star Wars: The Clone Wars, set between the 2008 animated film and Revenge of the Sith. He is voiced by Terrence "T.C." Carson. Windu is a lead character in several story arcs, including taking part in the liberation of Ryloth, having to deal with Boba Fett's attempts to avenge the death of his father Jango, trying to recover a Jedi Holocron stolen by Cad Bane, and working with Jar Jar Binks to rescue the captured Queen of Bardotta from a cult led by Mother Talzin.

In the seventh season, released on Disney+ in 2020, Windu and Obi-Wan lead the Republic's ground forces in the Anaxes campaign, and the former manages to deactivate a bomb hidden by Admiral Trench as a contingency plan once he is defeated. Later, during a meeting with the Jedi Council, Windu orders Ahsoka Tano to deliver the captured Darth Maul to Coruscant, and declines to discuss sensitive information with her, as she is no longer part of the Jedi Order. While in the process of delivering Maul, Ahsoka senses Anakin turning to the dark side and helping Palpatine kill Windu; archive recordings of Samuel L. Jackson as Mace Windu were used for this scene.

Literature
In 2017, Marvel released Star Wars: Jedi of the Republic – Mace Windu, a five-issue comic series centered around Windu during the early days of the Clone Wars. The series received negative reviews for both its art and story. It follows Windu leading a small team of Jedi to a remote planet to investigate a Separatist presence. Windu battles a mercenary droid hired by General Grievous, and one of the Jedi turns on Windu after becoming disillusioned with the Order's involvement in war.

Windu also appears in flashbacks in the comic miniseries Star Wars Jedi: Fallen Order – Dark Temple.

The 2022 novel Brotherhood (focused on Obi-Wan and Anakin) acknowledges Windu's ability to sense "shatterpoints", established in the Legends continuity.

Legends
Windu appears extensively in prequel-era Expanded Universe material. In April 2014, most of the licensed Star Wars novels and comics produced since the originating 1977 film were rebranded by Lucasfilm as Star Wars Legends and declared non-canon to the franchise.

Clone Wars (2003–2005) 
Mace Windu is a supporting character in Genndy Tartakovsky's micro-series Star Wars: Clone Wars, which is set and aired between Attack of the Clones and Revenge of the Sith. In the first chapters, he defends the grasslands planet Dantooine against a large Separatist hovering "fortress", and over the course of the battle, he loses his lightsaber, forcing him to instead use a lethal form of unarmed combat powered by the Force. In the final chapters, Windu and Yoda help defend Coruscant from an attack by General Grievous, though the latter is successful in kidnapping Palpatine, thus initiating the events of Revenge of the Sith.

Comics 
The 1999 "Emissaries to Malastare" arc of the Dark Horse Comics' self-titled Star Wars series, set shortly after The Phantom Menace, mentions a Jedi exercise in which Windu had swapped his lightsaber with Eeth Koth. However, the lightsaber returned to him is blue, so this does not explain why his saber color changed to purple, as is sometimes claimed.

Novels
Windu has appeared as a supporting character in Legends/Expanded Universe novels, such as Cloak of Deception, Darth Maul: Shadow Hunter, Rogue Planet, Outbound Flight, The Cestus Deception, Jedi Trial, Yoda: Dark Rendezvous and Labyrinth of Evil.

Shatterpoint

Mace Windu is the central character of Matthew Stover's 2004 novel Shatterpoint, taking place six months after Attack of the Clones. Stover based the novel on both Joseph Conrad's novel Heart of Darkness, and its 1979 film adaptation Apocalypse Now. George Lucas wrote the prologue to the novel, and Jonathan Davis reads the audiobook version.

Windu's former Padawan and fellow Jedi Master Depa Billaba has been sent to Windu's homeworld, Haruun Kal, to start a revolution against the Separatist-allied government. Evidence is discovered that Billaba has fallen to the dark side of the Force. Since Windu taught her a special lightsaber combat form, he is sent by the Jedi Council to find her.

After a fight, he puts Billaba under arrest, and calls a Republic cruiser. It is attacked by vulture droids and deploys gunships, which battle the droid starfighters with the assistance of clone troopers. Some of the landing craft make it to the surface, and the cruiser defeats the Separatists. Windu uses the gunships to destroy the droid fighters that followed them, then orders the clones to take out a nearby droid control station. The Separatists are forced to surrender to the Republic, and Billaba falls into a vegetative coma. A Republic force stays on the planet to police the unrestful local tribes.

The novel explores Windu's unique talent of sensing "shatterpoints", faultlines in the Force which allow him to exploit his enemies' weaknesses. It also explains that Windu is the creator and sole master of a style of lightsaber combat called Vaapad, in which the user skirts dangerously close to the dark side by enjoying the thrill of the fight. All others who attempted to master the form either gave in to the dark side or were unable to properly master the technique. Stover later referenced Windu's unique lightsaber-fighting abilities in his novelization of Revenge of the Sith. Vaapad was also acknowledged in the 2010 reference book The Jedi Path.

Merchandising
An action figure was released following the prequel films' release.  A Mace Windu action figure was added to the Star Wars Transformers toy line in 2006. It was a remold of the toy first used for Obi-Wan Kenobi. He becomes an Eta-2 Actis-class light interceptor starfighter with Astromech droid R4-M6.
He also received his own legacy Lightsaber at Star Wars: Galaxy's Edge, before being discontinued around April-June 2021.

Legacy
IGN listed Mace Windu as the 27th best Star Wars character, stating that he is an important component of the series.

Samuel L. Jackson called for Windu's return at Star Wars Celebration in 2017, saying that "We all know Jedi can fall from incredible heights and survive, so apparently, I am not dead. Yes, I have two appendages right now, but we know the long and rich history of Star Wars characters reappearing with new appendages".

Relationships

Mentorship tree

Further reading

Star Wars Episode III: Revenge of the Sith Novelization – Novelization, 1st edition hardcover, 2005. Matthew Woodring Stover, George Lucas, 
Shatterpoint (novel), 1st edition, 2003. Matthew Woodring Stover, 
The New Essential Guide to Characters, 1st edition, 2002. Daniel Wallace, Michael Sutfin, 
Star Wars: The Phantom Menace: The Visual Dictionary, hardcover, 1999. David West Reynolds, 
Star Wars: Attack of the Clones: The Visual Dictionary, hardcover, 2002. David West Reynolds, 
Revised Core Rulebook (Star Wars Roleplaying Game), 1st edition, 2002. Bill Slavicsek, Andy Collins, J.D. Wiker, Steve Sansweet, 
Star Wars Roleplaying Game: Power of the Jedi Sourcebook, hardcover, 2002. Michael Mikaelian, Jeff Grubb, Owen K.C. Stephens, James Maliszewski, 
Star Wars Galaxy Guide 7: Mos Eisley, softcover, 1993. Martin Wixted,

References

External links
 
 

Black characters in films
Characters created by George Lucas
Fictional generals
Fictional murdered people
Fictional war veterans
Film characters introduced in 1999
Male characters in comics
Male characters in film
Male characters in television
Star Wars comics characters
Star Wars Jedi characters
Star Wars literary characters
Star Wars Skywalker Saga characters
Star Wars: The Clone Wars characters
Tales of the Jedi (TV series) characters
Star Wars video game characters
Fictional amputees